James (Jim) Gibson is a co-founder, director and chief executive officer of Big Yellow Group. He is a chartered accountant. Prior to co-founding Big Yellow he was finance director of Heron Property Corporation Limited and Edge Properties PLC.

He is also  a non-executive director and shareholder of AnyJunk Limited and Moby Self Storage Brazil , CityStasher Ltd (a left luggage tech platform)  and Chair of the London Children's Ballet.

References

External links
Profile at Big Yellow website

Living people
Date of birth missing (living people)
British accountants
British business executives
British real estate businesspeople
Year of birth missing (living people)